DJO is an American medical device company headquartered in Lewisville, Texas, that produces a variety of orthopedic products for rehabilitation, pain management, and physical therapy. It has multiple divisions including Bracing & Supports, Surgical, Footcare, Healthcare Solutions, Recovery, and Consumer.

DJO has more than five thousand employees in more than a dozen facilities around the world.

History 
DJO began in 1978 as DonJoy, a small company founded in a Carlsbad, California garage by the Philadelphia Eagles’ offensive line captain, Mark Nordquist and a local lawyer, Ken Reed. Together, they named their new company after their wives, Donna and Joy.

In 1987, the company was acquired by British medical device conglomerate, Smith & Nephew, for $20 million.

In 1999, the DonJoy management team arranged a leveraged buyout, changed the name from DonJoy to DJ Orthopedics, and took the company public again in 2001. Over the next several years, the company acquired all or part of seven new companies.

In 2007, Blackstone Group bought DJO for $1.6 billion, renaming the company DJO Global.  

In the first quarter of 2019, Colfax Corporation, a publicly traded, diversified technology company, acquired DJO.

In 2018, the company announced plans to move its headquarters to Lewisville, Texas.

References

External links

Manufacturing companies established in 1978
Companies based in San Diego County, California
Medical technology companies of the United States
Privately held companies based in California
Health care companies based in California
1978 establishments in California